Ireland was represented by Butch Moore, with the song "I'm Walking the Streets in the Rain", at the 1965 Eurovision Song Contest, which took place on 20 March in Naples. This was the first time Ireland participated in the Eurovision Song Contest.

Before Eurovision

National final

The final was held at the studios of broadcaster RTÉ in Dublin on Tuesday 9 February 1965, and hosted by Bunny Carr. Twelve songs took part, with the winner chosen by voting from twelve regional juries. Other participants included future Irish representative Dickie Rock (1966).

At Eurovision
Ireland performed 4th at the beginning of the start field. Ireland finished 6th with 11 points.

Voting

References

 Eurovision Song Contest : National Final : Ireland 1965 - ESC-History.com

1965
Countries in the Eurovision Song Contest 1965
Eurovision
Eurovision